Nautical wheelers refers to a ship builder that specifically works on the fabrication of hulls of ships. The technique called wheeling is used to form the metal panels that form the hulls of ships. 

Nautical Wheelers is the name of a song by Jimmy Buffett originally released on the album A1A (Geffen 1974).

Shipbuilding